This is a list of submissions to the 66th Academy Awards for Best Foreign Language Film. The Academy Award for Best Foreign Language Film was created in 1956 by the Academy of Motion Picture Arts and Sciences to honour non-English-speaking films produced outside the United States. The award is handed out annually, and is accepted by the winning film's director, although it is considered an award for the submitting country as a whole. Countries are invited by the Academy to submit their best films for competition according to strict rules, with only one film being accepted from each country.

For the 66th Academy Awards, thirty-five films were submitted in the category Academy Award for Best Foreign Language Film. The Academy had initially invited 57 countries to send their best films, and the submission deadline was set on November 22, 1993. While the rules were basically unchanged, the applications for the 66th Academy Awards included a new form requesting information about the nationalities of the film's creative team, due to the controversy that had led to the disqualification of A Place in the World at the 65th Academy Awards.

The bolded titles were the five nominated films, which came from Hong Kong, Spain, Taiwan, the United Kingdom and Vietnam. It was the first time that the majority of the nominees in this category came from outside Europe (it happened again in 1997, 2006, 2011 and 2018) and is the only time when there have been three Asian nominees. Vietnam made history by becoming the only Southeast Asian country ever to be nominated in this category (accurate ). The prize was ultimately awarded to Spain for the romantic comedy, Belle Époque.

Submissions

References

66